Acer CloudMobile S500 is an Android smartphone that was announced in February 2012 and released in September 2012. The Acer CloudMobile S500 tech specifications includes a 4.3 inch IPS Display, Krait dual-core processor running at 1.5 GHz with 1 GB of RAM, 8 MP rear camera and a front-facing HD camera for video calls, face unlock or self-portrait photography. The device runs Android 4.0.4 (ICS), and it is 97% Vanilla OS, has only minor modifications on drop down notifications and on the slide to unlock.

CloudMobile S500
Android (operating system) devices
Touchscreen portable media players
Mobile phones introduced in 2012